The South American Youth Championship 1977 was held in Caracas, Mérida and Valencia, Venezuela. It also served as qualification for the 1977 FIFA World Youth Championship.

Teams
The following teams entered the tournament:

 
 
 
 
 
 
 
 
  (host)

First round

Group A

Group B

Final round

Qualification to World Youth Championship
The three best performing teams qualified for the 1977 FIFA World Youth Championship.

External links
Results by RSSSF

South American Youth Championship
1977 in youth association football